Hongkong Flight 143 is a 2006 Philippine television drama series broadcast by GMA Network. Directed by Kitchie Benedicto, it stars Pauleen Luna, Mark Herras and James Blanco. It premiered on February 20, 2006. The series concluded on May 12, 2006 with a total of 58 episodes.

Cast and characters
Lead cast
 Mark Herras as Bogz
 Pauleen Luna as Trina
 James Blanco as Andy

Supporting cast
 Jackie Lou Blanco
 Rez Cortez
 Robert Ortega
 Danica Sotto
 Lovely Rivero
 Tessie Villarama

References

External links
 

2006 Philippine television series debuts
2006 Philippine television series endings
Aviation television series
Filipino-language television shows
GMA Network drama series
Television shows set in Hong Kong
Television shows set in the Philippines